Lincoln Township is a township in Hamilton County, Iowa, USA.

References

Hamilton County, Iowa
Townships in Iowa